The Westdeutsche Zeitung (WZ) is one of the largest regional newspaper in North Rhine-Westphalia, Germany. Its headquarters is in Wuppertal with additional offices in Düsseldorf and Krefeld.

In 2001 the circulation of the WZ was 214,000 copies.

References

External links

1887 establishments in Germany
German-language newspapers
Mass media in Wuppertal
Publications established in 1887
Daily newspapers published in Germany
German news websites